Lauren Bell may refer to:

 Lauren Bell (cricketer) (born 2001), English cricketer
 Lauren Bell (cyclist) (born 1999), Scottish cyclist